Xenochironomus is a genus of European non-biting midges in the subfamily Chironominae of the bloodworm family Chironomidae.

Species
X. trisetosis (Kieffer, 1922)
X. ugandae (Goetghebuer, 1936)
X. xenolabis Kieffer in Thienemann and Kieffer, 1916

References

Chironomidae
Diptera of Europe